Leferink is a surname.  Notable people with the surname include:

 Elles Leferink (born 1976), Dutch volleyball player
 Niki Leferink (born 1976), Dutch former football striker